The men's 10,000 meter at the 2010 KNSB Dutch Single Distance Championships took place in Heerenveen at the Thialf ice skating rink on Sunday 1 November 2009. Although this tournament was held in 2009 it was part of the speed skating season 2009–2010. There were 12 participants.

Statistics

Result

Source:

Draw

References

Single Distance Championships
2010 Single Distance